María Adriana Peña Hernández (born 9 March 1964 in Minas) is a Uruguayan dentist and politician, belonging to the National Party. 

Since 2010 she has been the Intendant of Lavalleja Department, the first woman ever to hold that post.

References

Living people
1964 births
Intendants of Lavalleja Department
University of the Republic (Uruguay) alumni
Uruguayan dentists
National Party (Uruguay) politicians
Women mayors of places in Uruguay
21st-century Uruguayan women politicians
21st-century Uruguayan politicians